The 70th Massachusetts General Court, consisting of the Massachusetts Senate and the Massachusetts House of Representatives, met in 1849 during the governorship of George N. Briggs. Joseph M. Bell served as president of the Senate and Francis Crowninshield served as speaker of the House.

Senators

Representatives

See also
 31st United States Congress
 List of Massachusetts General Courts

References

External links
 
 

Political history of Massachusetts
Massachusetts legislative sessions
massachusetts
1849 in Massachusetts